Sir Charles Lyell, 1st Baronet,  (14 November 1797 – 22 February 1875) was a Scottish geologist who demonstrated the power of known natural causes in explaining the earth's history. He is best known as the author of Principles of Geology (1830–33), which presented to a wide public audience the idea that the earth was shaped by the same natural processes still in operation today, operating at similar intensities. The philosopher William Whewell termed this gradualistic view "uniformitarianism" and contrasted it with catastrophism, which had been championed by Georges Cuvier and was better accepted in Europe. The combination of evidence and eloquence in Principles convinced a wide range of readers of the significance of "deep time" for understanding the earth and environment.

Lyell's scientific contributions included a pioneering explanation of climate change, in which shifting boundaries between oceans and continents could be used to explain long-term variations in temperature and rainfall. Lyell also gave influential explanations of earthquakes and developed the theory of gradual "backed up-building" of volcanoes. In stratigraphy his division of the Tertiary period into the Pliocene, Miocene, and Eocene was highly influential. He incorrectly conjectured that icebergs may be the impetus behind the transport of glacial erratics, and that silty loess deposits might have settled out of flood waters. His creation of a separate period for human history, entitled the 'Recent', is widely cited as providing the foundations for the modern discussion of the Anthropocene.

Building on the innovative work of James Hutton and his follower John Playfair, Lyell favoured an indefinitely long age for the earth, despite evidence suggesting an old but finite age.  He was a close friend of Charles Darwin, and contributed significantly to Darwin's thinking on the processes involved in evolution. As Darwin wrote in On the Origin of Species, "He who can read Sir Charles Lyell's grand work on the Principles of Geology, which the future historian will recognise as having produced a revolution in natural science, yet does not admit how incomprehensibly vast have been the past periods of time, may at once close this volume." Lyell helped to arrange the simultaneous publication in 1858 of papers by Darwin and Alfred Russel Wallace on natural selection, despite his personal religious qualms about the theory. He later published evidence from geology of the time man had existed on the earth.

Biography
Lyell was born into a wealthy family, on 14 November 1797, at the family's estate house, Kinnordy House, near Kirriemuir in Forfarshire. He was the eldest of ten children. Lyell's father, also named Charles Lyell, was noted as a translator and scholar of Dante. An accomplished botanist, it was he who first exposed his son to the study of nature. Lyell's grandfather, also Charles Lyell, had made the family fortune supplying the Royal Navy at Montrose, enabling him to buy Kinnordy House.

The family seat is located in Strathmore, near the Highland Boundary Fault. Round the house, in the strath, is good farmland, but within a short distance to the north-west, on the other side of the fault, are the Grampian Mountains in the Highlands. His family's second country home was in a completely different geological and ecological area: he spent much of his childhood at Bartley Lodge in the New Forest, in Hampshire in southern England.

Lyell entered Exeter College, Oxford, in 1816, and attended William Buckland's geological lectures. He graduated with a BA Hons. second class degree in classics, in December 1819, and gained his M.A. 1821. After graduation he took up law as a profession, entering Lincoln's Inn in 1820. He completed a circuit through rural England, where he could observe geological phenomena. In 1821 he attended Robert Jameson's lectures in Edinburgh, and visited Gideon Mantell at Lewes, in Sussex. In 1823 he was elected joint secretary of the Geological Society. As his eyesight began to deteriorate, he turned to geology as a full-time profession. His first paper, "On a recent formation of freshwater limestone in Forfarshire", was presented in 1826. By 1827, he had abandoned law and embarked on a geological career that would result in fame and the general acceptance of uniformitarianism, a working out of the ideas proposed by James Hutton a few decades earlier.

In 1832, Lyell married Mary Horner in Bonn, daughter of Leonard Horner (1785–1864), also associated with the Geological Society of London. The new couple spent their honeymoon in Switzerland and Italy on a geological tour of the area.

During the 1840s, Lyell travelled to the United States and Canada, and wrote two popular travel-and-geology books: Travels in North America (1845) and A Second Visit to the United States (1849). In 1866, he was elected a foreign member of the Royal Swedish Academy of Sciences. After the Great Chicago Fire in 1871, Lyell was one of the first to donate books to help found the Chicago Public Library.

In 1841, Lyell was elected as a member to the American Philosophical Society.

Lyell's wife died in 1873, and two years later (in 1875) Lyell himself died as he was revising the twelfth edition of Principles. He is buried in Westminster Abbey where there is a bust to him by William Theed in the north aisle.

Lyell was knighted (Kt) in 1848, and later, in 1864, made a baronet (Bt), which is an hereditary honour. He was awarded the Copley Medal of the Royal Society in 1858 and the Wollaston Medal of the Geological Society in 1866. Mount Lyell, the highest peak in Yosemite National Park, is named after him; the crater Lyell on the Moon and a crater on Mars were named in his honour; Mount Lyell in western Tasmania, Australia, located in a profitable mining area, bears Lyell's name; and the Lyell Range in north-west Western Australia is named after him as well. In Southwest Nelson in the South Island of New Zealand, the Lyell Range, Lyell River and the gold mining town of Lyell (now only a camping site) were all named after Lyell. Lyall Bay in Wellington, New Zealand was possibly named after Lyell. The jawless fish Cephalaspis lyelli, from the Old Red Sandstone of southern Scotland, was named by Louis Agassiz in honour of Lyell.

Career and major writings
Lyell had private means, and earned further income as an author. He came from a prosperous family, worked briefly as a lawyer in the 1820s, and held the post of Professor of Geology at King's College London in the 1830s. From 1830 onward his books provided both income and fame. Each of his three major books was a work continually in progress. All three went through multiple editions during his lifetime, although many of his friends (such as Darwin) thought the first edition of the Principles was the best written. Lyell used each edition to incorporate additional material, rearrange existing material, and revisit old conclusions in light of new evidence.

Throughout his life, Lyell kept a remarkable series of nearly three hundred manuscript notebooks and diaries. These span Lyell’s long scientific career (1825-1874), and offer an unrivalled insight into personal influences, field observations, thoughts and relationships. They were acquired in 2019 by the University of Edinburgh's Heritage Collections, thanks to a fundraising campaign, with many generous individual and institutional donors from the UK and overseas. Highlights include his travels throughout Europe and the United States of America, the drafts of his correspondence with the likes of Charles Darwin, his geological and landscape sketches and his constant gathering of evidence and refinement of his theories.

Principles of Geology, Lyell's first book, was also his most famous, most influential, and most important. First published in three volumes in 1830–33, it established Lyell's credentials as an important geological theorist and propounded the doctrine of uniformitarianism. It was a work of synthesis, backed by his own personal observations on his travels.

The central argument in Principles was that the present is the key to the past – a concept of the Scottish Enlightenment which David Hume had stated as "all inferences from experience suppose ... that the future will resemble the past", and James Hutton had described when he wrote in 1788 that "from what has actually been, we have data for concluding with regard to that which is to happen thereafter." Geological remains from the distant past can, and should, be explained by reference to geological processes now in operation and thus directly observable. Lyell's interpretation of geological change as the steady accumulation of minute changes over enormously long spans of time was a powerful influence on the young Charles Darwin. Lyell asked Robert FitzRoy, captain of HMS Beagle, to search for erratic boulders on the survey voyage of the Beagle, and just before it set out FitzRoy gave Darwin Volume 1 of the first edition of Lyell's Principles. When the Beagle made its first stop ashore at St Jago in the Cape Verde islands, Darwin found rock formations which seen "through Lyell's eyes" gave him a revolutionary insight into the geological history of the island, an insight he applied throughout his travels.

While in South America Darwin received Volume 2 which considered the ideas of Lamarck in some detail. Lyell rejected Lamarck's idea of organic evolution, proposing instead "Centres of Creation" to explain diversity and territory of species. However, as discussed below, many of his letters show he was fairly open to the idea of evolution. In geology Darwin was very much Lyell's disciple, and brought back observations and his own original theorising, including ideas about the formation of atolls, which supported Lyell's uniformitarianism. On the return of the Beagle (October 1836) Lyell invited Darwin to dinner and from then on they were close friends. 

Although Darwin discussed evolutionary ideas with him from 1842, Lyell continued to reject evolution in each of the first nine editions of the Principles. He encouraged Darwin to publish, and following the 1859 publication of On the Origin of Species, Lyell finally offered a tepid endorsement of evolution in the tenth edition of Principles.

Elements of Geology began as the fourth volume of the third edition of Principles: Lyell intended the book to act as a suitable field guide for students of geology. The systematic, factual description of geological formations of different ages contained in Principles grew so unwieldy, however, that Lyell split it off as the Elements in 1838. The book went through six editions, eventually growing to two volumes and ceasing to be the inexpensive, portable handbook that Lyell had originally envisioned. Late in his career, therefore, Lyell produced a condensed version titled Student's Elements of Geology that fulfilled the original purpose.

Geological Evidences of the Antiquity of Man brought together Lyell's views on three key themes from the geology of the Quaternary Period of earth history: glaciers, evolution, and the age of the human race. First published in 1863, it went through three editions that year, with a fourth and final edition appearing in 1873. The book was widely regarded as a disappointment because of Lyell's equivocal treatment of evolution. Lyell, a highly religious man with a strong belief in the special status of human reason, had great difficulty reconciling his beliefs with natural selection.

Scientific contributions
Lyell's geological interests ranged from volcanoes and geological dynamics through stratigraphy, palaeontology, and glaciology to topics that would now be classified as prehistoric archaeology and paleoanthropology. He is best known, however, for his role in elaborating the doctrine of uniformitarianism. He played a critical role in advancing the study of loess.

Uniformitarianism
From 1830 to 1833 his multi-volume Principles of Geology was published. The work's subtitle was "An attempt to explain the former changes of the earth's surface by reference to causes now in operation", and this explains Lyell's impact on science. He drew his explanations from field studies conducted directly before he went to work on the founding geology text. He was, along with the earlier John Playfair, the major advocate of James Hutton's idea of uniformitarianism, that the earth was shaped entirely by slow-moving forces still in operation today, acting over a very long period of time. This was in contrast to catastrophism, an idea of abrupt geological changes, which had been adapted in England to explain landscape features—such as rivers much smaller than their associated valleys—that seemed impossible to explain other than through violent action. Criticizing the reliance of his contemporaries on what he argued were ad hoc explanations, Lyell wrote,

Never was there a doctrine more calculated to foster indolence, and to blunt the keen edge of curiosity, than this assumption of the discordance between the former and the existing causes of change... The student was taught to despond from the first. Geology, it was affirmed, could never arise to the rank of an exact science... [With catastrophism] we see the ancient spirit of speculation revived, and a desire manifestly shown to cut, rather than patiently untie, the Gordian Knot.-Sir Charles Lyell, Principles of Geology, 1854 edition, p. 196; quoted by Stephen Jay Gould.

Lyell saw himself as "the spiritual saviour of geology, freeing the science from the old dispensation of Moses." The two terms, uniformitarianism and catastrophism, were both coined by William Whewell; in 1866 R. Grove suggested the simpler term continuity for Lyell's view, but the old terms persisted. In various revised editions (12 in all, through 1872), Principles of Geology was the most influential geological work in the middle of the 19th century, and did much to put geology on a modern footing.

Geological surveys
Lyell noted the "economic advantages" that geological surveys could provide, citing their felicity in mineral-rich countries and provinces. Modern surveys, like the British Geological Survey (founded in 1835), and the US Geological Survey (founded in 1879), map and exhibit the natural resources within their countries. Over time, these surveys have been used extensively by modern extractive industries, such as nuclear, coal and oil.

Volcanoes and geological dynamics

Before the work of Lyell, phenomena such as earthquakes were understood by the destruction that they brought. One of the contributions that Lyell made in Principles was to explain the cause of earthquakes. Lyell, in contrast focused on recent earthquakes (150 yrs), evidenced by surface irregularities such as faults, fissures, stratigraphic displacements and depressions.

Lyell's work on volcanoes focused largely on Vesuvius and Etna, both of which he had earlier studied. His conclusions supported gradual building of volcanoes, so-called "backed up-building", as opposed to the upheaval argument supported by other geologists.

Stratigraphy and human history
Lyell was a key figure in establishing the classification of more recent geological deposits, long known as the Tertiary period. From May 1828, until February 1829, he travelled with Roderick Impey Murchison (1792–1871) to the south of France (Auvergne volcanic district) and to Italy. In these areas he concluded that the recent strata (rock layers) could be categorised according to the number and proportion of marine shells encased within. Based on this the third volume of his Principles of Geology, published in 1833, proposed dividing the Tertiary period into four parts, which he named the Eocene, Miocene, Pliocene, and Recent. In 1839, Lyell termed the Pleistocene epoch, distinguishing a more recent fossil layer from the Pliocene. The Recent epoch renamed the Holocene by French paleontologist Paul Gervais in 1867 included all deposits from the era subject to human observation. In recent years Lyell's subdivisions have been widely discussed in relation to debates about the Anthropocene.

Glaciers

In Principles of Geology (first edition, vol. 3, ch. 2, 1833) Lyell proposed that icebergs could be the means of transport for erratics. During periods of global warming, ice breaks off the poles and floats across submerged continents, carrying debris with it, he conjectured. When the iceberg melts, it rains down sediments upon the land. Because this theory could account for the presence of diluvium, the word drift became the preferred term for the loose, unsorted material, today called till. Furthermore, Lyell believed that the accumulation of fine angular particles covering much of the world (today called loess) was a deposit settled from mountain flood water. Today some of Lyell's mechanisms for geological processes have been disproven, though many have stood the test of time. His observational methods and general analytical framework remain in use today as foundational principles in geology.

Evolution
Lyell initially accepted the conventional view of other men of science, that the fossil record indicated a directional geohistory in which species went extinct. Around 1826, when he was on circuit, he read Lamarck's Zoological Philosophy and on 2 March 1827 wrote to Mantell, expressing admiration, but cautioning that he read it "rather as I hear an advocate on the wrong side, to know what can be made of the case in good hands".:
I devoured Lamarck... his theories delighted me... I am glad that he has been courageous enough and logical enough to admit that his argument, if pushed as far as it must go, if worth anything, would prove that men may have come from the Ourang-Outang. But after all, what changes species may really undergo!... That the earth is quite as old as he supposes, has long been my creed...
He struggled with the implications for human dignity, and later in 1827 wrote private notes on Lamarck's ideas. Lyell reconciled transmutation of species with natural theology by suggesting that it would be as much a "remarkable manifestation of creative Power" as creating each species separately. He countered Lamarck's views by rejecting continued cooling of the earth in favour of "a fluctuating cycle", a long-term steady-state geohistory as proposed by James Hutton. The fragmentary fossil record already showed "a high class of fishes, close to reptiles" in the Carboniferous period which he called "the first Zoological era", and quadrupeds could also have existed then. In November 1827, after William Broderip found a Middle Jurassic fossil of the early mammal Didelphis, Lyell told his father that "There was everything but man even as far back as the Oolite." Lyell inaccurately portrayed Lamarckism as a response to the fossil record, and said it was falsified by a lack of progress. He said in the second volume of Principles that the occurrence of this one fossil of the higher mammalia "in these ancient strata, is as fatal to the theory of successive development, as if several hundreds had been discovered."

In the first edition of Principles, the first volume briefly set out Lyell's concept of a steady state with no real progression of fossils. The sole exception was the advent of humanity, with no great physical distinction from animals, but with absolutely unique intellectual and moral qualities. The second volume dismissed Lamarck's claims of animal forms arising from habits, continuous spontaneous generation of new life, and man having evolved from lower forms. Lyell explicitly rejected Lamarck's concept of transmutation of species, drawing on Cuvier's arguments, and concluded that species had been created with stable attributes. He discussed the geographical distribution of plants and animals, and proposed that every species of plant or animal was descended from a pair or individual, originated in response to differing external conditions. Species would regularly go extinct, in a "struggle for existence" between hybrids, or a "war one with another" due to population pressure. He was vague about how replacement species formed, portraying this as an infrequent occurrence which could rarely be observed.

The leading man of science Sir John Herschel wrote from Cape Town on 20 February 1836, thanking Lyell for sending a copy of Principles and praising the book as opening a way for bold speculation on "that mystery of mysteries, the replacement of extinct species by others" – by analogy with other intermediate causes, "the origination of fresh species, could it ever come under our cognizance, would be found to be a natural in contradistinction to a miraculous process". Lyell replied: "In regard to the origination of new species, I am very glad to find that you think it probable that it may be carried on through the intervention of intermediate causes. I left this rather to be inferred, not thinking it worth while to offend a certain class of persons by embodying in words what would only be a speculation." 
Whewell subsequently questioned this topic, and in March 1837 Lyell told him:
If I had stated... the possibility of the introduction or origination of fresh species being a natural, in contradistinction to a miraculous process, I should have raised a host of prejudices against me, which are unfortunately opposed at every step to any philosopher who attempts to address the public on these mysterious subjects...

As a result of his letters and, no doubt, personal conversations, Huxley and Haeckel were convinced that, at the time he wrote Principles, he believed new species had arisen by natural methods. Sedgwick wrote worried letters to him about this.

By the time Darwin returned from the Beagle survey expedition in 1836, he had begun to doubt Lyell's ideas about the permanence of species. He continued to be a close personal friend, and Lyell was one of the first scientists to support On the Origin of Species, though he did not subscribe to all its contents. Lyell was also a friend of Darwin's closest colleagues, Hooker and Huxley, but unlike them he struggled to square his religious beliefs with evolution. This inner struggle has been much commented on. He had particular difficulty in believing in natural selection as the main motive force in evolution.

Lyell and Hooker were instrumental in arranging the peaceful co-publication of the theory of natural selection by Darwin and Alfred Russel Wallace in 1858: each had arrived at the theory independently. Lyell's views on gradual change and the power of a long time scale were important because Darwin thought that populations of an organism changed very slowly.

Although Lyell rejected evolution at the time of writing the Principles, after the Darwin–Wallace papers and the Origin Lyell wrote in one of his notebooks on 3 May 1860:
Mr. Darwin has written a work which will constitute an era in geology & natural history to show that... the descendants of common parents may become in the course of ages so unlike each other as to be entitled to rank as a distinct species, from each other or from some of their progenitors...

Lyell's acceptance of natural selection, Darwin's proposed mechanism for evolution, was equivocal, and came in the tenth edition of Principles. The Antiquity of Man (published in early February 1863, just before Huxley's Man's place in nature) drew these comments from Darwin to Huxley: "I am fearfully disappointed at Lyell's excessive caution" and "The book is a mere 'digest'".Quite strong remarks: no doubt Darwin resented Lyell's repeated suggestion that he owed a lot to Lamarck, whom he (Darwin) had always specifically rejected. Darwin's daughter Henrietta (Etty) wrote to her father: "Is it fair that Lyell always calls your theory a modification of Lamarck's?"

In other respects Antiquity was a success. It sold well, and it "shattered the tacit agreement that mankind should be the sole preserve of theologians and historians". But when Lyell wrote that it remained a profound mystery how the huge gulf between man and beast could be bridged, Darwin wrote "Oh!" in the margin of his copy.

Legacy
Places named after Lyell:

 Lyell, New Zealand
 Lyell Butte, in the Grand Canyon
 Lyell Canyon in Yosemite National Park
 Lyell Fork, one of two large forks of the Tuolumne River
 Lyell Land (Greenland)
 Lyell Glacier
 Lyell Glacier, South Georgia
 Mount Lyell (California)
 Mount Lyell (Canada)
 Mount Lyell (Tasmania)
Lyell Avenue (Rochester, NY)

Bibliography

Principles of Geology

 Principles of Geology 1st edition, 1st vol. Jan. 1830 (John Murray, London).
 Principles of Geology 1st edition, 2nd vol. Jan. 1832 
 Principles of Geology 1st edition, 3rd vol. May 1833
 Principles of Geology 2nd edition, 1st vol. 1832
 Principles of Geology 2nd edition, 2nd vol. Jan. 1833
 Principles of Geology 3rd edition, 4 vols. May 1834
 Principles of Geology 4th edition, 4 vols. June 1835
 Principles of Geology 5th edition, 4 vols. March 1837
 Principles of Geology 6th edition, 3 vols. June 1840
 Principles of Geology 7th edition, 1 vol. Feb. 1847
 Principles of Geology 8th edition, 1 vol. May 1850
 Principles of Geology 9th edition, 1 vol. June 1853
 Principles of Geology 10th edition, 1866–68
 Principles of Geology 11th edition, 2 vols. 1872
 Principles of Geology 12th edition, 2 vols. 1875 (published posthumously)

Elements of Geology
 Elements of Geology 1 vol. 1st edition, July 1838 (John Murray, London)
 Elements of Geology 2 vols. 2nd edition, July 1841
 Elements of Geology (Manual of Elementary Geology) 1 vol. 3rd edition, Jan. 1851
 Elements of Geology (Manual of Elementary Geology) 1 vol. 4th edition, Jan. 1852
 Elements of Geology (Manual of Elementary Geology) 1 vol. 5th edition, 1855
 Elements of Geology 6th edition, 1865
 Elements of Geology, The Student's Series, 1871

Travels in North America

Antiquity of Man

 Geological Evidences of the Antiquity of Man 1 vol. 1st edition, Feb. 1863 (John Murray, London)
 Geological Evidences of the Antiquity of Man 1 vol. 2nd edition, April 1863
 Geological Evidences of the Antiquity of Man 1 vol. 3rd edition, Nov. 1863
 Geological Evidences of the Antiquity of Man 1 vol. 4th edition, May 1873

Life, Letters, and Journals

Notes

References

 

 

 

 
 

 

Image source
 Portraits of Honorary Members of the Ipswich Museum (Portfolio of 60 lithographs by T.H. Maguire) (George Ransome, Ipswich 1846–1852)

Further reading 
 Time's Arrow, Time's Cycle (1978), a book by Stephen Jay Gould that reassesses Lyell's work
 Worlds Before Adam: The Reconstruction of Geohistory in the Age of Reform (2008), a major overview of Lyell's work in its scientific context by Martin J. S. Rudwick
 Principles of Geology: Penguin Classics (1997), the key chapters of Lyell's most famous work with an introduction by James A. Secord

External links
 
 
 
 
 
 
 Principles of Geology 1st edition at ESP.
 Principles of Geology (7th edition, 1847) from Linda Hall Library

1797 births
1875 deaths
19th-century British geologists
Academics of King's College London
Alumni of Exeter College, Oxford
Burials at Westminster Abbey
Fellows of the Royal Society
Knights Bachelor
Members of Lincoln's Inn
Members of the Royal Swedish Academy of Sciences
People from Angus, Scotland
Presidents of the Geological Society of London
Recipients of the Copley Medal
Recipients of the Pour le Mérite (civil class)
Royal Medal winners
Scottish deists
Scottish geologists
Scottish knights
Scottish travel writers
Wollaston Medal winners
Lyell, Charles, 1st Baronet
People educated at Midhurst Grammar School